The Asian Women’s Softball Championship is the main championship tournament between national women's softball teams in Asia, governed by the Softball Confederation of Asia.

Results

Medal table
As of 2019 Asian Women's Softball Championship.

See also
Asian Men's Softball Championship

References

International softball competitions
Softball Championship
Recurring sporting events established in 1967
Women's sports competitions in Asia